Haisiyat is a 1984 Hindi-language drama film, produced by Srikanth Nahata under the Vijayalakshmi Pictures banner and directed by Dasari Narayana Rao. It stars Jeetendra, Jaya Prada in the pivotal roles and music composed by Bappi Lahari. The film is remake of Tamil movie Kanavan Manaivi (1976).

Plot 
Ram (Jeetendra) is a sincere and hardworking young man in a factory located in Bombay, India. He is the factory's union leader as well, and attempts to get a good deal for all the workers from the factory's management. He wants bonus for all the workers in the factory. But factory manager Ravi (Shakti Kapoor) creates every possible hurdle in Ram's way. Disappointed workers want strike in the factory. However, Ram stops them and asks to wait factory's new owner, Sita (Jaya Prada) who is a beautiful, young but strict lady. She is coming back from America. Ravi makes her against workers. Therefore, she refuses to meet workers who come with Ram to give flowers to new factory owner. Ram is a good singer. One day, when he was singing a song, Sita attracts by his voice and comes to him. Both fall in love with each other in two to three meetings without knowing reality that Ram is worker and Sita is factory owner. At last, when reality reveals to both of them, Sita proposes Ram for marriage. However, Ram is reluctant in accepting the proposal due to huge difference in their status. But Sita assures him that in the factory, he would continue his work as union leader and at home, she would serve him as her beloved wife. Ram accepts the proposal and both eventually get married. After marriage, Sita is elected as President of Chamber of Commerce. Conflict of bonus to factory workers becomes intense when Sita refuses to give bonus. After tying his best, Ram as union leader has no choice to take hard stance for welfare of workers. Ram starts hunger strike. When condition of Ram becomes worst, Sita goes to him and gives him drink. Strike is temporarily over. However, workers kill one of businessmen in Chamber of Commerce. In reaction, Sita closes the factory permanently leaving workers to die of hunger. Ram takes the case to court. Court decides in favour of workers. Sita takes it as her humiliation and her conflict with Ram goes to its peak. Sita leaves Ram's house. She wants to get revenge from workers for her disgrace. Ravi assures her of his help for the purpose. Ravi wants to kidnap and kill Sita. Ram and factory workers save her life. Sita realizes that she was wrong. So Ram prefers his workers over his wife. After great trials and tribulations, Ram and Sita unite forever.

Cast 

Jeetendra as Ram
Jaya Prada as Sita 
Pran as Jagdish
Kader Khan as Ravi's father
Shakti Kapoor as Ravi 
Satyendra Kapoor (guest appearance)
Rohini Hattangadi as Shanta
Om Shivpuri as Father of Sita seen only in Photoframe (Uncredited)
Jayshree T.
Raza Murad
Bhushan Tiwari
Viju Khote as Ganpat, mill worker
Anuradha as item number

Soundtrack 
All songs were penned by Indeevar,  except "Jaagi Jaagi Re Jaagi" (Farooq Kaiser).

References

External links 
 

1984 films
1980s Hindi-language films
Films directed by Dasari Narayana Rao
Films scored by Bappi Lahiri
Indian drama films
Films about the labor movement
Hindi remakes of Tamil films
Hindi-language drama films